Dviete is a settlement in Dviete parish in southeastern Latvia.

References

External links 
 Satellite map at Maplandia.com
 
 

Towns and villages in Latvia